Clint Ramos is a Filipino-American costume and set designer for stage and screen. For his work on the 2016 Broadway production of Eclipsed, Ramos became the first person of color to win the Tony Award for Best Costume Design in a Play.

Ramos has hundreds of credits including working as a costume designer on the film Respect (2021) for MGM Studios starring Jennifer Hudson and production and costume designer on Lingua Franca (2019) directed by Isabel Sandoval. He has received four additional Tony Award nominations for his work on the 2018 Broadway revival of Once on This Island, the 2019 Broadway revival of Torch Song, the 2020 Broadway revival of The Rose Tattoo, and Slave Play (nominated for Set Design).

He was costume director for the 2013 worldwide premiere production at New York's  Public Theater of the David Byrne and Fatboy Slim disco pop musical Here Lies Love and he reprises that role as well as that of producer in the upcoming 2023 Broadway revival.

Background

Ramos studied Theatre Arts at the University of the Philippines Diliman. He got involved in costume design through the university's theatre society, Dulaang UP. He moved to the United States in 1993 where he was awarded a scholarship to NYU Tisch, going on to graduate with a Master of Fine Arts in Design in 1997.

Ramos has given lectures at NYU Tisch and Fordham University, where he was Head of Theater Design.

Awards and nominations

References

External links

Living people
American costume designers
American gay artists
Cebuano people
Filipino designers
Filipino emigrants to the United States
Filipino LGBT artists
Fordham University faculty
Set designers
Tisch School of the Arts alumni
Tisch School of the Arts faculty
Tony Award winners
University of the Philippines Diliman alumni
Year of birth missing (living people)